Sphenophorus parvulus, commonly known as the bluegrass billbug, is a species of beetle in the family Curculionidae. It is found in North America, especially in the eastern United States. It is a pest of Kentucky bluegrass, other grasses, corn and grain crops.

Taxonomy
Swedish entomologist Leonard Gyllenhaal described the bluegrass billbug in 1838. The species name is derived from the Latin adjective parvus "small".

Description
The thorax bears deep puncture marks and the elytra have longitudinal grooves. These billbugs are usually some shade of brown, grey or black.

Distribution and habitat
The bluegrass billbug is native to North America. Its range extends from Ontario and Nova Scotia southwards to Idaho, New Mexico and Florida. It is commonest in the east of its range. It is found in grassland, including lawns, especially in association with Kentucky bluegrass, as well as in corn and other grain crops.

Ecology
The adult beetle feeds on seedlings and tender young shoots of various grasses. It seldom flies, preferring to scramble among the crop plants. Although Kentucky bluegrass seems to be its favored host plant, it will also feed on timothy-grass, redtop grass, maize, wheat and other small grain crops. Its feeding leaves a characteristic row of identical small holes across an unfolding leaf-blade. Breeding takes place in the late spring and there is a single generation. The female chews a hole in the stem of a grass plant and deposits a single egg inside. The developing white, legless, larva hollows out the inside of the stem and feeds around the root crown. The plant often wilts, and can be distorted, weakened or even killed by the actions of adults and larvae. When fully developed, the larva pupates, either in the stem or in the soil, and overwinters as an adult or as a pre-emergent adult inside the pupal case. Adult females may lay between 40 and 200 eggs over the course of one to three months.

References

Further reading

 Arnett, R.H. Jr., M. C. Thomas, P. E. Skelley and J. H. Frank. (eds.). (2002). American Beetles, Volume II: Polyphaga: Scarabaeoidea through Curculionoidea. CRC Press LLC, Boca Raton, FL.
 
 Richard E. White. (1983). Peterson Field Guides: Beetles. Houghton Mifflin Company.

Dryophthorinae
Beetles of North America
Pest insects
Beetles described in 1838
Taxa named by Leonard Gyllenhaal